I'm Scared may refer to:

 I'm Scared, a 1951 science fiction short story by Jack Finney
 "I'm Scared", a song by Evelyn "Champagne" King on her album A Long Time Coming (A Change Is Gonna Come)
 I'm Scared, an album by the indie rock band Jacob's Mouse
 "I'm Scared", the B-side of the Brian May single "Too Much Love Will Kill You"
 "I'm Scared", a song in the film Small Soldiers
 "I'm Scared", a song by Duffy on her album Rockferry
 "I'm Scared", a song by Young Thug on his album So Much Fun
 "I'm Scared", a song by Bill Wurtz